Sébastien Ogier (born 17 December 1983) is a French rally driver, competing for the Toyota Gazoo Racing Team in the World Rally Championship (WRC), who is teamed with the co-driver Julien Ingrassia. He has won the World Rally Drivers' Championship 8 times, in 2013, 2014, 2015, 2016, 2017, 2018, 2020, & 2021.

Achieving 57 victories in the World Rally Championship and 8 titles (6 consecutive, 2013–2018), he is the 2nd most successful WRC driver, after former Citroën WRC teammate Sébastien Loeb (9 titles). Furthermore, he is one of two drivers (together with Juha Kankkunen) to have won the World Championship with 3 different manufacturers.

Rally career

Early years (2005–2007) 
Ogier's rally career began in 2005 when he won the French Federation's Rallye Jeunes and was rewarded with a place in the Peugeot 206 Cup for the following season. Teamed with co-driver Julien Ingrassia, he claimed a podium at Terre des Cardabelles and sixth place in the championship along with the Best Rookie award.

In 2007, Ogier won the Peugeot 206 Cup with four victories (Diois, Langres, Causses, Touquet) and two second places (Alsace-Vosges, Limousin). He also won the Rallye Hivernal des Hautes-Alpes. In April 2007, he took part in his first regional rally (Rallye du Quercy) placing third overall in a Peugeot 206 XS.

Ogier received the Espoir Echappement de l’année award, an honorific prize from professionals and fans, joining past winners Didier Auriol, François Delecour and Sébastien Loeb.

World Championship (2008)

JWRC Champion 

In the 2008 season, Ogier moved to compete a full Junior World Rally Championship program, driving a Super 1600-class Citroën C2 for the Equipe de France FFSA team.

Ogier debuted in the World Rally Championship at the 2008 Rally Mexico, winning first in the JWRC class, and becoming the first JWRC driver to take a WRC point thanks to his eighth place overall finish. He won again in Jordan: after a four-minute loss due to mechanical failure, he stormed back, eventually taking the victory when the leader went off the road.

After this second successive win, he retired from Rally Sardinia with a broken steering rod. However, he restarted thanks to the SupeRally rule and finished fifth. Ogier went on to take further junior category victory in Germany. He then dominated his class at Rally Catalunya scoring most of the best times, but went off the road during the last leg.

After a cautious start at his home event, the Tour de Corse, Ogier clinched the Junior world champion title by placing second.

First WRC rally and first stage win 
After winning the JWRC title, Ogier was rewarded with his first World Rally Car drive in a Citroën C4 for Rally GB. He surprised the more experienced drivers by winning the first stage on the ice and taking a shock lead for his first WRC rally. With the advantage of his road position, he kept the lead until the fifth stage, before losing time with a mechanical trouble. He eventually crashed out from eighth place on day two.

Citroën (2009–2011)

2009: 1st full WRC season (1st podium) and win in Monte-Carlo (IRC) 

In January 2009, Ogier made a one-off appearance in the Intercontinental Rally Challenge, contesting the Monte Carlo Rally. He won the prestigious event for his first rally in a Kronos Peugeot 207 S2000.

It was only a one-off participation in IRC: for the 2009 season, Ogier was signed in WRC to capitalize on his Junior title. At the start of the season, he was supposed to take part in the first six rounds of the world championship with a C4 WRC of Citroën's satellite team, and that the remaining rallies of the season would depend on his results. Despite a few mistakes, his performances pushed the squad to confirm him for the rest of the season.

At the Acropolis Rally, Ogier drove to his first podium place, finishing second to Ford's Mikko Hirvonen.

2010: 2nd full WRC season (1st win) 
In January 2010, Ogier took part again in the Rallye Monte-Carlo with a Peugeot 207 S2000. After losing two minutes going off-road at the start of the race (on snow put by some spectators), he then scored a lot of stage wins and came back 45 seconds off the leader Mikko Hirvonen, but eventually retired on the last day with an alternator problem.

As Monte-Carlo was still part of the IRC calendar, Ogier's 2010 season really started in Sweden with the first round of the WRC year. The Frenchman continued in the Citroën Junior Team with the 2007 Formula One world champion Kimi Räikkönen as his new teammate. He took fifth place in Sweden after a solid performance and clinched his second podium in Mexico after duelling against Petter Solberg until the last minute. In Jordan he took an excellent start and was lying second in the standings after the first two legs, however team orders forced him to take several minutes of penalty at a time control. He still ended in sixth position. In Turkey, Sébastien led during eleven stages, before losing three minutes with a puncture in SS15, eventually finishing fourth. At the Rally New Zealand, he came even closer to his maiden win as he was leading before the final stage, but spun three corners before the finish and lost the win to Latvala by 2.4 seconds (third smallest gap in the history).

Ogier went on to take his debut WRC victory in the next event, the Rally de Portugal. Keeping the momentum from his performances in Turkey and New-Zealand, he took 45 seconds from road-sweeper Sébastien Loeb on day one. Although Loeb came back, Ogier made no mistake and eventually beat him by 8 seconds. He went on to win Rally della Lanterna in Italy, a guest appearance he made to gain experience on asphalt as he had always been more confident on gravel.

Given his solid results, his team spirit and Dani Sordo’s disappointing performances, Citroën promoted Ogier to the factory team for the remaining three gravel rounds of the season. Subsequently, Sordo replaced Ogier in the manufacturer's junior team. It proved to be a judicious decision as Sébastien Ogier took a solid second place in Finland, in front of Sébastien Loeb, whereas he was 4th and 3rd behind Sordo and Loeb on asphalt (in Bulgaria and Germany). He took his second WRC win in Japan after a thrilling duel against Petter Solberg and impressed by his capacity to quickly adapt himself to a rally he had never raced before.

He was just 43 points behind teammate Sébastien Loeb with three events to go, therefore still having a chance for the title. However, in the last three rallies he would only score nine points, making him lose two positions to Jari Matti Latvala and Petter Solberg and finishing the season in fourth place.

2011: Citroën official driver 

Ogier continued his progression in 2011. Given his performances in 2010, he was given a drive with Citroën's factory team for the full 2011 season, replacing Dani Sordo. As he was promised to be treated equally with Loeb, the fans awaited a great battle for the title.

The DS3 WRC didn't make the expected debut in Sweden, however Ogier (4th) beat Loeb (6th), and also became the first driver to win a Power Stage. Their battle turned out to a duel in Mexico where Ogier started the last day as leader before going off the road. He went on to win the next two rallies in Portugal and Jordan: with two-tenth on Jari-Matti Latvala, he beat the record of the smallest winning gap. 4th in Sardinia, Ogier came close to another victory in Argentina: while he started the last leg with a 43.7s advantage on Hirvonen, he rolled; this led him to finish with no steering wheel and cost him the win in the last stage. He ended in third position behind Sébastien Loeb and Mikko Hirvonen.

Ogier went on to claim victory on the Acropolis Rally, but his relationship with Sébastien Loeb deteriorated. Following a classic WRC strategy, the Frenchman slowed down on the Saturday evening to force his teammate to open the road the day after. To do so, he based himself on Loeb's times sent by his team, while a technical problem prevented Loeb from receiving the same information. The rally ended in a controversial atmosphere as Loeb had difficulty accepting to sweep the road on these gravel stages. Loeb bounced back in Finland, while Ogier ended in third position after a puncture during the last day. The tension between the two Citroën drivers knew their peak in Germany, where Sébastien Loeb had never been beaten. Before the start of the race, the reigning World Champion announced the extension of his contract with Citroën until the end of 2013. In that media context, the brand imposed team orders at the end of the first leg, while Loeb and Ogier were separated by only 7 seconds, with a big margin over their rivals. It was a beautiful battle and Sébastien Ogier didn't accept to be sacrificed so early and in such a disrespectful way. This is what he publicly said, giving rise to a huge controversy. The win eventually went to him, as Loeb punctured a tyre.

In Australia, Ogier didn't make the most of Sébastien Loeb going off the road as he made a mistake as well during the first day. After a thrilling climb in the standings that brought him up to ninth place and close to eighth, the team asked him to slow down at the end of the rally to let his teammate pass and score one point for the championship: he took a voluntary penalty and stopped on the side of the road for around ten minutes. Also helped by team orders, Mikko Hirvonen won the rally and therefore became a serious title contender, 8 points off Loeb. Ogier took a convincing win at the Rallye de France Alsace: after Loeb retired because of a technical problem, he resisted Dani Sordo’s and Petter Solberg’s pressure and went on to take the maximum points for the team. He also made a good operation for the Drivers’ championship and left Alsace 3 points off the co-leaders Sébastien Loeb and Mikko Hirvonen. Two rounds before the end of the season, the championship seemed to be wide open, but Loeb did eventually clinch the title. After an engine problem in Spain and an accident in Great-Britain, Sébastien Ogier ended the championship in third position with five wins (as many as Sébastien Loeb) and four Power Stages’ best times (the best rate of the season). His tense relationship with Citroën management led to his discharge, which was officially announced on 16 November. He was then replaced by Mikko Hirvonen.

Volkswagen (2012-2016)

2012: A new story with Volkswagen 

On 23 November 2011, Volkswagen subsequently announced a three-year contract with Sébastien Ogier and his codriver Julien Ingrassia. They became the official crew of the team to spearhead Volkswagen's WRC assault, planned for 2013. In 2012, they contested the championship in a Škoda Fabia S2000 whilst developing the new Polo R WRC for a full-time WRC season in 2013.

Ogier's 2012 season started with Rallye Monte-Carlo, where he set some good times although his Škoda Fabia S2000 was less competitive than the WRC that were battling for the win. But in the 10th stage, he went off the road in a sixth-gear sector. Ogier was unhurt, his codriver was slightly injured. Before the crash, Ogier was 6th in the overall rally standings.

In the Rally Sweden, Ogier took 11th place with four minutes of margin on Per-Gunnar Andersson, the official winner in S2000. Sébastien Ogier took his first points of the season and the very first ones for Volkswagen Motorsport with an eighth place at the Rally Mexico.

In Sweden and in Mexico, he had to compose with a superior status compared to the other S2000 drivers and therefore had to sweep the roads for them. This changed at the Rally Portugal and the situation became more equitable. He then scored a series of points scorings and regularly battled against WRC drivers. His best result came in Sardinia, where he took the fifth place – the best result of a S2000 car.

2013: First World Champion title 

In parallel to his 2012 season with the Škoda Fabia S2000, Sébastien Ogier followed an intense testing programme developing the Volkswagen Polo R WRC and preparing its debut in the championship.

Launched at Monaco at the end of 2012, the car was ready for the first round of the season, the 2013 Rallye Monte Carlo. Despite the youth of the car and some treacherous weather conditions, Sébastien Ogier finished in second position. It sounded like an ideal start, a proper relief that confirmed the promising level of the Polo.

The 2013 season went ahead with Rally Sweden, where Ogier became the second non-Nordic winner since its creation in 1950, after Loeb's victory in 2004. His win in Sweden was also the maiden one for the Polo R WRC. He added the 3 bonus points of a Power Stage win and took the lead of the championship. And this was only the beginning. Ogier then took the victory in Mexico, winning 16 stages out of 23 and another double rally – Power Stage success. Same again in Portugal where he finished with more than 3 minutes of margin over Mikko Hirvonen, second.

In Argentina,  the handbrake gave problems and Sébastien Ogier lost time with a straight on the mud, which cost him the lead of the rally. As Sébastien Loeb won, Ogier secured some valuable points with second place. Bad luck struck again in Greece, where he lost his chances of winning as soon as in the SS1, with a puncture and a fuel alimentation problem. Thanks to the Rally 2 rule, he managed to save the tenth position and took the three bonus points of the Power Stage.

Sébastien Ogier made his comeback on the top spot of the podium in Italy, beating Thierry Neuville and Jari-Matti Latvala. For the first time in his career, he dominated a rally from the first stage to the last one. He also took another win in the Power Stage.

His winning series went on in Finland, despite his co-driver's shoulder injury. He took the first victory of his career in this rally by winning more than half of the stages – and in particular the legendary Ouninpohja of which he beat the record. With two more points in the Power Stage, he extended his lead at the top of the world championship standings.

In Germany, Sébastien Ogier already had an opportunity to secure the title. However he broke his front-left suspension missing a braking point during the first leg. Back on the road the following day, he climbed from 47th to 17th in the overall standings and took another Power Stage win. With Thierry Neuville second and Jari-Matti Latvala seventh, Sébastien Ogier came closer to the title. In Australia he had real chances to become champion. However, despite a thrilling race, 19 stage wins out of 22, he lost the title in the last stage: as Hirvonen punctured a tyre, Neuville took second place and Ogier therefore missed the title for one point.

Sébastien Ogier eventually won the 2013 championship in the first stage of Rally France (which happened to be the bonus-points-rewarding Power Stage) because second-placed Thierry Neuville couldn't catch Ogier anymore even with rally wins. The Frenchman ended the season with some more victories in France, Spain and, for the first time in his career, Wales.

He ended the season with 9 wins, 11 podiums, 111 special stages wins (46,83% of the season), 7 Power Stages wins and a total number of 28 points grabbed in these particular stages, and a total of 290 points in the championship, a record for WRC.

2014: Confirming with a second title 

Sébastien Ogier cautiously considers that a title is harder to defend than to win. However his victory in the Rallye Monte-Carlo confirmed his leading position in WRC at the start of the 2014 season. Unlike in 2009 this legendary rally was part of the WRC, which made it a very special moment for the reigning World Champion. Despite a wrong tyre choice on day one, he impressed with his climb in the standings and entered Monaco as a winner. Icing on the cake, the start was given in his native town of Gap and the first part of the race was back in the Hautes-Alpes.

Ogier made a mistake during Rally Sweden hitting a snowbank while leading and retrograded to the 20th position. His determination eventually led him to the 6th final place. His revenge came as soon as Rally Mexico: he took the lead in the first leg and increased his margin until finishing with a big margin on his opponents. He also won the Power Stage and was back at the lead of the championship in front of Latvala.

Sébastien Ogier managed to increase his overall lead on his teammate on the next round, Rally Portugal. He took the overall victory and won the Power Stage again, while Latvala went off the road. Rally Portugal was again synonymous of a win for the Frenchman - the fourth one for him on this round, which brought him closer to Markku Alen's record of five successes. Conversely Rally Argentina is one of the rare rallies of the season (with Rally Poland) where Ogier never won. In very hard conditions, he took second place and the Power Stage win. He was back on the top step of the podium in Italy, despite a tough first leg in which he had to open the road and sweep a slippery sandy surface. In Poland, he won both the rally and the Power Stage, to get a 50-point lead in the championship.

In Finland, Ogier scored the points of the second place and took another Power Stage win. His lead in the championship was unchanged after the next round, Rally Germany, where Ogier and Latvala both retired going off the road. However Volkswagen was assured that the Drivers' title would go to one of the team's drivers (Ogier, Latvala or Mikkelsen). The German squad secured the Manufacturers' title on the following round, in Australia, as Ogier was back on the top step of the podium. His first attempt in securing the championship failed though, as he was hit by a gearbox sensor failure at the start of Rally France. Despite the time lost, he managed to secure the Power Stage points. The relief came on his second try, in Catalonia. As they won the penultimate round of the season, Sébastien Ogier and Julien Ingrassia secured their second title. Ogier became the eighth driver to take a second crown, the fourth to do so two years in a row. Ingrassia is the sole French codriver crowned twice. The Frenchman ended the season in style with a win in Wales. With 8 wins, 10 podiums and 94 stage wins, Sébastien Ogier had a 49-point margin in the final standings.

Volkswagen renewed the contract of Sébastien Ogier and their other crews.

2015: Ogier keeps on winning 

In 2015, Sébastien Ogier stayed involved in WRC with the Volkswagen Motorsport team, codriven by Julien Ingrassia. Together, they won the first round of the season, the Rallye Monte-Carlo. The new Polo R WRC was immediately successful and so was the world champion crew despite the rivalry of Sébastien Loeb, who made a punctual comeback to rallying.

Ogier went ahead with another win in Sweden, where he came out as the winner in the very last stage, when Andreas Mikkelsen made a late mistake. Three out of three: it was a hat-trick for the Frenchman who also won Rally Mexico. This was his fifth consecutive win since 2014 Rally Catalunya and the third in a row in Mexico.

Rally Argentina marked the end of the series, as mechanical problems pushed him to retirement. He ended in 17th position and added the three bonus points of a Power Stage win. He won the Power Stage again on the following rally, in Portugal, while climbing the second final place. In addition to the disadvantage of sweeping a very sandy surface, the Frenchman lost time with a puncture before producing an impressive comeback to end 8.2s off the winner. This enabled him to confirm his leading position in the championship.

Ogier managed to come back to victory in Italy. Hayden Paddon produced his best performance to date and led the rally for a long time, but Ogier eventually took the win in the last leg and added again the Power Stage victory to his tally. Another rally and Power Stage double win came in Poland, while in Finland he had to settle for the second place overall. He took another Power Stage success though (the 7th successive) to leave Finland with an 89-point lead in the championship. He led VW to a 1–2–3 finish on Rally Germany, and went on to take the title on the next round with a win in Rally Australia. After taking the lead, Ogier and Ingrassia won all the remaining stages to take their 31st WRC win and their 3rd title. At the same moment, Volkswagen secured the Manufacturer title.

Rally France was not so lucky as Ogier suffered a gearbox failure at the end of day one. Despite a ten-minute penalty which relegated him to 55th position, he managed to end in 12th and won three more stages including the Power Stage. Sébastien Ogier then led Rally Spain for the last two legs but made a mistake in the very last stage. He was forced to retire after hitting a guardrail, a crash in which he and his codriver were unhurt. The season ended with a soaked Wales Rally GB where the Frenchmen won again. They dedicated their victory to the victims of Paris's attacks occurred on 13 November, during the rally weekend.

2016: 4-time world champion 

Still teamed up with Julien Ingrassia in the Volkswagen Motorsport squad for the fourth successive year, Ogier started the season with his third successive win on Rally Monte-Carlo. He then took another success on Rally Sweden, which had been shortened due to a lack of snow. In Mexico, Ogier had to sweep very dusty roads again but still took second place behind Latvala, also winning his third Power Stage out of three rallies. His first place in the championship penalized him again in Argentina, where he took second place, and then again in Portugal and Italy where he finished third. Rally Poland was even more difficult and ended up with a sixth place, before a small mistake cost him a lot in Finland, with no points scored.

He was back to the win in Germany, on Volkswagen's home soil. First full-tarmac rally of the season, it was won by the French pair for the second year in a row as they managed in the best way some very changeable road conditions. Ogier went on to win in Corsica after dominating the rally from start to finish. He was again on the top step of the podium in Spain and clinched the world champion title for the fourth time. His victory at Wales Rally GB brought the Manufacturers' title to Volkswagen, this also for the fourth successive year.

In the days following this success, Volkswagen announced its withdrawal from WRC.

M-Sport Ford (2017–2018) 

On 12 December 2016, Ogier announced he would be driving the new Ford Fiesta WRC for M-Sport Ford during the 2017 season.

On the first rally of the championship, Monte-Carlo, Ogier brought M-Sport Ford back to victory for the first time since the 2012 Wales Rally GB, taking the 39th victory of his personal career and the fifth one on this rally (including one not counting for WRC) with three different manufacturers.

The following months were made of highs and lows, with two wins and less special stage victories than in the past but nine podiums (after Wales Rally GB) that enabled him to score regular points. The second win came in Rally Portugal, where he equaled Markku Alén five victories and reached win number 40 in his career. Thanks to his consistency, he managed to clinch his fifth successive title, celebrating the success at Wales Rally GB, while M-Sport Ford also secured the manufacturers title.

2018 started very well, but turned out to be a gruelling year for Ogier. He won Monte Carlo to take the lead of the WRC drivers championship, but a lowly 10th position in Sweden opened the door for rival Thierry Neuville; who lead the championship for most of the year. Two more wins followed for Ogier, but a retirement in Portugal meant Neuville took the advantage.

The second half of the season saw mixed conditions, leaving the championship contenders struggling for points, particularly in Turkey.  A commanding win for Ogier in Wales finally broke the deadlock, and he began to win back points towards Neuville. Three successive wins for Ott Tänak, and a continued resolve by the Estonian, meant the drivers championship depended on the final result of the season finale in Australia. Ogier remained in good humour, and gained the advantage as rivals went off in muddy conditions, ultimately winning the 2018 WRC Drivers Championship.  Ogier and co-driver Ingrassia had successfully defended their championship titles for the sixth consecutive year.

Return to Citroën (2019) 
On 28 September 2018, it was announced that Ogier and Ingrassia will rejoin the Citroën World Rally Team for the 2019 season. This will mark the return of the six-time world champions to the French manufacturer after seven years.  Ogier claimed his sixth consecutive win at Monte Carlo, which also marked the 100th world rally success for Citroën. After an early retirement in Sweden, he won at Mexico and climbed to the podium at the next three rounds.

Although winning in Germany, and gaining second place in Spain, Ogier had been unhappy with his car during the season. On 30 November he told Autosport he planned to leave Citroën for Toyota with a year left on his contract. He blamed mixed results in the latter half of the season on slow development, a lack of performance, and a lack of communication in the team. Citroën responded by immediately withdrawing from the WRC from the date of Ogier's departure.

Toyota Gazoo Racing (2020–) 
Amid speculations and statements about his retirement from the sport, Ogier signed for Toyota for the 2020 season, with an option for 2021. The six-time world champion claimed second place at his home town event of Monte Carlo, and claimed the podium four further times during a shortened seven event championship. Contender Elfyn Evans took the lead for most of the season, but skidded on ice at the final event at the Monza race track, with only two stages still to go. Evans waved Ogier's car to slow down at the same corner where his car had floundered off the road. Ogier later remarked that this action saved his car from a similar incident. Ogier and co-driver Ingrassia lifted their seventh world titles at this event. Former teammate Jari-Matti Latvala became Team Principal at Toyota in 2021.

In 2021, Ogier picked up an option on his contract, but announced plans to retire at the end of the season. He began the season as the six-time defending winner in Monte Carlo. He started off the season with a seventh victory in Monte Carlo, which was also his 50th career victory. Next month, however, he had a poor showing in the snowy stages of the 2021 Arctic Rally Finland, including a crash near the end of stage eight cost him almost 10 minutes. He claimed wins at Croatia, Italy, Kenya and Monza, and finished third at Portugal and Greece, earning his eighth title over teammate Elfyn Evans.

Ogier had announced his intention to retire from the sport at the end of 2021. Later he decided to only contest selected events of the 2022 season.

Statistics

Titles

Victories

WRC victories

Number of WRC wins per rally

JWRC victories

IRC Victories

Other victories

World Rally Championship records 
 Champion with the biggest points gap: 114 points on Thierry Neuville, in the 2013 World Rally Championship (290 pts for Ogier against 176 pts for Neuville)
 Champion with the biggest points gap over his teammate: 128 points on Jari-Matti Latvala in the 2013 World Rally Championship
 Win with the slightest margin: 0.2 seconds on Jari-Matti Latvala at the Rally Jordan, 16 April 2011
 Stage wins rate in one season: 46.25% (111 wins out of 240 stages)
 Stages as a leader in one season: 62.92% (151 SS as a leader out of 240 stages)
 Points scored in one season: 290 pts in the 2013 World Rally Championship
 Most drivers' championship points overall: 2690 (2008–)

Racing record

Career summary

† As Ogier was a guest driver, he was ineligible to score points.
* Season still in progress.

Complete WRC results

* Season still in progress.

Complete J-WRC results

WRC summary

IRC results

Porsche Supercup results

† As Ogier was a guest driver, he was ineligible to score points.

Complete FIA World Endurance Championship results
(key) (Races in bold indicate pole position; races in italics indicate fastest lap)

* Season still in progress.

Complete 24 Hours of Le Mans results

Other races

Formula One 
In July 2017 he tested a Red Bull Racing RB7 at the Red Bull Ring in Austria.

Race of Champions 
 2011: Champion of Champions. For his ROC debut, he took the top step of the podium in the finals against Tom Kristensen (8-time winner of the 24 Heures du Mans), winning both heats at the Esprit Arena in Düsseldorf. He became the fourth Frenchman to win the title Champion of Champions.
 2012: He reached the Nations' Cup's finale with Romain Grosjean and the quarter-finals in the individual race.

Other 
 29–30 October 2011:
He took part in the last round of the French GT Championship at the Paul Ricard circuit. In these 2 GT Tour races he drove a Ferrari F430 Scuderia of the team Sport Garage, as the teammate of Lionel Comole, President of the Fondation Arthritis and amatorial driver.
Ogier also contested the finale round of the F4 French Championship with a single-seater of the Auto Sport Academy (i.e. the car that helped him to improve his late braking in corner entering on asphalt during his summer tests).
 16 July 2011:
He took part in the Moscow City Racing with Citroën. The Race of Stars (as it was called) was held close to the Kremlin.
 11 December 2011:
He took the 9th place of the ERDF Master-Kart of Paris-Bercy, against drivers coming from all kind of motorsport series.
 24–26 May 2013:
He contested the Monaco round of the Porsche Supercup, the series that is traditionally held before the Formula 1 Grand Prix. After a 14th place in qualifying, he ended 13th out of 26 drivers in the race.
 23–25 May 2014:
He took part in a round of the ADAC GT Masters, on the Lausitzring circuit. He drove an Audi R8 LMS Ultra of the Prosperia C. Abt Racing team, together with Markus Winkelhock. Together, they took the 13th place in Race 1 and the 8th in Race 2.
 20–22 June 2014:
Ogier took part in a second Porsche Supercup race, this time at the Red Bull Ring. Just like in 2013 at Monaco, he joins the Deutsche Post Project 1 team to drive a Porsche 911 GT3.
 21-23 September 2018:
After a test in August, he competed in the DTM round at the Red Bull Ring in a Mercedes-AMG C63, finishing 12th in Race 1 and 17th in Race 2.

Personal life 
Ogier is married to German television presenter Andrea Kaiser. Their son Tim was born on 13 June 2016. In 2021 he donated $10,000 of his winnings from the 2021 Safari Rally to each of two charities, the Nakuru Children's Project which focuses on children's education in Kenya and the Ol Pejeta Conservancy which protects Kenyan wildlife.

References

External links 

 
 Ogier at eWRC-results.com
 

1983 births
Living people
People from Gap, Hautes-Alpes
French rally drivers
Intercontinental Rally Challenge drivers
World Rally Championship drivers
World Rally Champions
French F4 Championship drivers
Porsche Supercup drivers
ADAC GT Masters drivers
Deutsche Tourenwagen Masters drivers
Sportspeople from Hautes-Alpes
24 Hours of Le Mans drivers
Auto Sport Academy drivers
HWA Team drivers
FIA World Endurance Championship drivers
Signature Team drivers
Toyota Gazoo Racing drivers
Abt Sportsline drivers
Citroën Racing drivers
Mercedes-AMG Motorsport drivers
Peugeot Sport drivers
Volkswagen Motorsport drivers
M-Sport drivers